Sweet Southern Sugar is the eleventh studio album by American recording artist Kid Rock. It was released on November 3, 2017, by Broken Bow Records, Top Dog Records and BMG Rights Management. The album spawned four singles: "Po-Dunk", "Greatest Show on Earth", "Tennessee Mountain Top", and "American Rock 'n Roll", along with their music videos. Its lead single, "Po-Dunk", peaked at number 27 on the Hot Country Songs. "Greatest Show on Earth" peaked at number 16 on the Mainstream Rock chart and it was used as the main theme for WWE pay-per-view Survivor Series (2017). "Tennessee Mountain Top" peaked at number 36 on the Hot Country Songs. Sweet Southern Sugar is Kid Rock's first album since his self-titled 2003 album not to feature a title track, though the album's name comes from a lyric in "Tennessee Mountain Top". The album also features a cover of the Four Tops song "I Can't Help Myself (Sugar Pie Honey Bunch)", titled "Sugar Pie Honey Bunch". The album's sixth track "Back to the Otherside" and tenth and final track "Grandpa's Jam" feature a return to the rapping vocals of Rock's earlier work.

Commercial performance

Sweet Southern Sugar debuted at number eight on the US Billboard 200 and number four on the US Billboard Top Country Albums with 43,000 album-equivalent units, with almost all of that figure (41,000) coming from pure album sales. It has sold 184,600 copies in the United States as of April 2019.

Track listing

Charts

Weekly charts

Year-end charts

Personnel 
listed inside the booklet from the album:

Kid Rock 

 Robert James Ritchie Sr. - drum programming, drums, acoustic guitar, keyboards, percussion, background vocals, B3 Organ, turntables

Additional personnel

Backing vocalists 

 Herschel Boone - background vocals
 Danny Rader - background vocals
 Joey Hyde - background vocals
 Shannon Curfman - background vocals
 Aaron Eshuis - background vocals
 Stacy Michelle - background vocals
 Kristen Rogers - background vocals
 Morgan Hebert - background vocals
 Stephcynie Curry - background vocals

Drummers 

 Jerry Roe
 Stefanie Eulinberg
 John “Rook” Cappelletty

Others 

 Paradime - tambourine, turntables
 Jimmie Bones - piano, background vocals
 Marlon Young - bass guitar, acoustic guitar, electric guitar
 Mike E. Clark - drum programming, producer

Guitarists 

 Gordy Quist - electric guitar
 Adam Shoenfeld - electric guitar
 Nathan Young - electric guitar
 Jason Krause - electric guitar
 Derek Wells - electric guitar
 Rob McNelley - electric guitar

Pianists 

 Tim Lauer - piano, keyboards, mellotron, synth, Rhodes, strings (string machine)
 Justin Niebank - piano, synth
 Jim "Moose" Brown - piano, B3 Organ
 Dave Cohen - piano, B3 Organ, keyboards, synths

Bassists 

 Jimmie Lee Sloas - bass guitar
 Tony Lucido - bass guitar
 Aaron Julison - bass guitar

References

2017 albums
Country albums by American artists
Kid Rock albums
Southern rock albums